George Clark (1888-1946) was a British film actor and film producer during the silent era. For many years Clark worked with the British star Guy Newall, whom he had met during the First World War. Together they founded Lucky Cat Films and later George Clark Productions, securing a distribution arrangement with the larger Stoll Pictures.

After initially working out of a studio on Ebury Street in Central London, they raised finance to construct Beaconsfield Studios and work began in 1921. They opened the new studio the following year, but after being hit by the Slump of 1924 remained largely inactive for the rest of the decade. Clark later sold the studios to the British Lion Film Corporation in 1929.

Selected filmography

Producer
 Duke's Son (1920)
 Testimony (1920)
 The Bigamist (1921)
 The Persistent Lovers (1921)
 Boy Woodburn (1922)
 A Maid of the Silver Sea (1922)
 Fox Farm (1922)
 The Starlit Garden (1923)

References

Bibliography
 Low, Rachel. The History of British Film: Volume IV, 1918–1929. Routledge, 1997.
 Warren, Patricia. British Film Studios: An Illustrated History. Batsford, 2001.

External links

1888 births
1946 deaths
English male silent film actors
English film producers
People from Bromley
Male actors from Kent
20th-century English male actors
20th-century English businesspeople